Valdivieso is a Spanish-language surname derived from the Valdivielso valley in Burgos, Spain. Notable people with the surname include:

Gabriel Larraín Valdivieso (1925–2008), Chilean Roman Catholic bishop
Alfonso Valdivieso Sarmiento (born 1949), Colombian lawyer and politician
Domingo Valdivieso (1832–1872), Spanish painter
Edison Valdivieso (born 1989), Ecuadorian footballer
José Valdivieso (1921–1996), Argentinian footballer and manager
Juan Valdivieso (1910–2007), Peruvian footballer and manager
Luis Valdivieso Montano, Peruvian diplomat
Luis P. Valdivieso, Puerto Rican politician
Luz Valdivieso (born 1977), Chilean actress
Mercedes Valdivieso (1924–1993), Chilean writer
Rafael Valentín Valdivieso (1804–1878), Chilean priest and lawyer
Guillermo Vivas Valdivieso, Puerto Rican journalist and politician

Spanish-language surnames